The clerk of the Privy Council is the professional head of the Public Service of Canada. As the deputy minister for the Privy Council Office (the prime minister's department), the clerk is the senior civil servant in the Government of Canada and serves as the secretary to the Cabinet.  

The role of the clerk is nonpartisan; clerks may serve multiple prime ministers and do not belong to any political party. As the secretary to the Cabinet, the role provides impartial advice to the ministry and oversees the advice and policy support given to Cabinet and its committees. As head of the public service, the clerk is responsible for other deputy ministers and the provision of non-partisan, expert advice to the government as a whole.

The clerk is a Governor-in-Council appointment made on the advice of the prime minister. On March 1, 2021, Prime Minister Justin Trudeau announced that Janice Charette would serve as interim clerk of the Privy Council as of March 9, 2021, as incumbent Ian Shugart underwent cancer treatment. She was permanently named to the position on May 25, 2022.

History 
The Privy Council for Canada was created and authorized by the Constitution Act, 1867, and there has been a clerk of the Privy Council since then.

The staff of the Privy Council increased from 142 to 352 between 1971 and 1975.

In 1989, reforms initiated by Prime Minister Brian Mulroney gave the clerk position its present day responsibilities. Expert Donald Savoie describes these as a combination of three roles: "the secretary of cabinet, the head of the non-partisan public service, and the deputy minister — or top bureaucrat — to the prime minister." One critique of this arrangement is that it could put senior nonpartisan officials in the position of taking partisan positions. Clerks generally have extensive previous experience in the Public Service of Canada before being appointed.

See also
Clerk of the Privy Council (United Kingdom)

References

Notes

External links
 Clerk of the Privy Council

 
Federal departments and agencies of Canada